Helpyourselfish is the 5th studio album from Danish rock band D-A-D. It was released on 1 March 1995 and is the follow-up album to the highly successful Riskin' It All. It features a break from most D-A-D-albums, with a heavier sound.

Track listing 

"Reconstrucdead" - 4:15
"Written in Water" - 4:24
"Helpyourselfish" - 4:40
"Soulbender" - 5:34
"Unowned" - 4:16
"Candid" - 3:20
"Blood In/Out" - 3:16
"Prayin' to a God" - 4:37
"Naked (But Still Stripping)" - 4:43
"Are We Alive Here???" - 4:50
"It'swhenit'swrongit'sright" - 2:43
"Flat" - 4:32
"Time Swallows Time" (Bonus-track on the Japanese edition)

To date the album has sold 102,000+ copies in Denmark.

References

External links 
 This album on D-A-D's official homepage

1995 albums
D.A.D. (band) albums
Albums produced by Paul Northfield